George Davis McDill (July 28, 1838June 15, 1899) was an American lawyer and Republican politician.  He served four years in the Wisconsin State Assembly, representing Polk County and surrounding areas.  He also served four years as district attorney of Polk County and was chairman of the county board of supervisors.  He served in the Iron Brigade of the Army of the Potomac through most of the American Civil War.

Early life
McDill was born on July 28, 1838, in Wayne Township, Crawford County, Pennsylvania.  When he was a toddler, he moved with his parents to Beloit, Wisconsin Territory, and then to De Soto, in Vernon County, Wisconsin.

Civil War service

At the outbreak of the American Civil War, he joined up with a company of volunteers for service in the Union Army.  His company was enrolled as Company I in the 6th Wisconsin Infantry Regiment in the summer of 1861.  The 6th Wisconsin Infantry was organized into a brigade which became famous as the Iron Brigade of the Army of the Potomac, serving in the eastern theater of the war.  McDill served with the regiment through the first three years of the war, fighting in some of the most important battles of the war, including Second Bull Run, Antietam, Chancellorsville, and Gettysburg.

In March 1864, he was commissioned as a second lieutenant and assigned to Company K of the newly-raised 37th Wisconsin Infantry Regiment.  He was promoted to first lieutenant two months later.  Serving with the 37th Infantry, he participated in the Siege of Petersburg and was wounded at the Battle of the Crater—named for the detonation of a sapper mine intended to undermine the Confederate defense line. He was designated for promotion to captain in September 1864 but was mustered out due to his wounds before the promotion was confirmed.

Legal and political career
After the war, McDill studied law and was admitted to the bar at Prairie du Chien, Wisconsin, in 1870.  In 1872 he established a legal practice in Polk County, Wisconsin, where he lived for most of the rest of his life.  In 1873, he was elected district attorney of Polk County.  He was re-elected in 1875.  He also served five years as chairman of the Polk County Board of Supervisors.

McDill was a member of the Republican Party of Wisconsin, and was elected to the Wisconsin State Assembly in 1880 from the district comprising Polk, Ashland, Barron, Bayfield, Burnett, and Douglas counties.  He was re-elected from that district in 1881.  After redistricting and a constitutional amendment which changed legislative terms in 1882, he was elected to a two-year term from a new Assembly district comprising just Polk County. He was not a candidate for re-election in 1884.

His legal practice flourished in Polk County for the rest of his life.  He died on June 15, 1899, at his home in Osceola, Wisconsin.

Personal life and family
George Davis McDill was a grandson of James McDill, an Irish American immigrant who served in the Pennsylvania Militia during the War of 1812.  George Davis' uncles, Alexander S. McDill and Thomas McDill were also prominent politicians in Wisconsin.  Alexander McDill served a term in the United States House of Representatives; Thomas McDill served in the Wisconsin Assembly and served as a quartermaster in the Union Army.

George Davis McDill married Emma Ankeny on November 25, 1871.  They had eight children together, though their first son, James, died in infancy.

Electoral history

Wisconsin Assembly (1880, 1881, 1882)

| colspan="6" style="text-align:center;background-color: #e9e9e9;"| General Election, November 2, 1880

| colspan="6" style="text-align:center;background-color: #e9e9e9;"| General Election, November 8, 1881

| colspan="6" style="text-align:center;background-color: #e9e9e9;"| General Election, November 7, 1882

References

External links

|-

People from Crawford County, Pennsylvania
People from Polk County, Wisconsin
Republican Party members of the Wisconsin State Assembly
County supervisors in Wisconsin
District attorneys in Wisconsin
People of Wisconsin in the American Civil War
Union Army officers
Union Army soldiers
1838 births
1899 deaths
Burials in Wisconsin
19th-century American politicians
Military personnel from Pennsylvania